The 1898 North Carolina A&M Aggies football team represented the North Carolina A&M Aggies of North Carolina College of Agriculture and Mechanic Arts during the 1898 college football season. They played a single game, against  North Carolina, losing 34–0. This team was led by first-year head coach W. C. Riddick, for whom Riddick Stadium, opened in 1907, was named.

Schedule

References

North Carolina AandM
NC State Wolfpack football seasons
College football winless seasons
North Carolina AandM Aggies football